Founded in 1929, The Washington Restaurant Association is the state restaurant industry association in the state of Washington, United States. It represents a total of 14,039 Washington restaurants. Eighty-four percent of restaurants in Washington employ fewer than twenty people per location. The state restaurant industry employs 227,500 people and is the state's largest private employer. The average restaurant profit before taxes is $32,742. While not all state restaurants are members the industry as a whole is predominantly represented by the association.

The WRA is sanctioned by the National Restaurant Association.

In October 2015, the WRA began joint operations with the Washington Lodging Association. The two associations are partnering on all fronts and are working on combining forces in a unified hospitality association in the fall of 2016.

Activities 
The association, in conjunction with the Washington Restaurant Education Foundation, develops a variety of educational classes, such as food safety and Alcohol Server Training, and business assistance programs, such as a workers’ compensation program, health insurance and financial and legal consultation. The association also represents its members with advocacy efforts at the state level, with the Washington State Legislature, and at the local level with city and county municipalities.

References

External links 
 Washington Restaurant Association
 Washington Restaurant Education Foundation
 The National Restaurant Association
 Washington State Legislature

 
National Restaurant Association
Culinary professional associations